Rizzo's Fine Pizza is a pizzeria in New York City, with locations at 31-33 Steinway Street in Astoria, Queens and 17 Clinton Street in Manhattan. 

Rizzo's Fine Pizza is known for their thin-crusted, Sicilian-style, square pizza.

References

External links 
Rizzos Fine Pizza - Official website

Pizzerias in New York City